Thedo Remmelink (born 22 April 1963) is a Dutch snowboarder. He competed in the men's giant slalom event at the 1998 Winter Olympics.

References

1963 births
Living people
Dutch male snowboarders
Olympic snowboarders of the Netherlands
Snowboarders at the 1998 Winter Olympics
Sportspeople from Gelderland
20th-century Dutch people